Intercourse, subtitled Contemporary Canadian Writing, was a literary magazine published in Montreal from 1966 to 1971. In all 14 issues appeared. The magazine was established and edited by Raymond Fraser and LeRoy Johnson, and had a number of guest editors, including Alden Nowlan, Al Pittman, Louis Cormier, and Bernell MacDonald. Among the contributors were such Canadian literary figures as Irving Layton, Al Purdy, Elizabeth Brewster, Leonard Cohen, Hugh Hood, Marty Gervais, John Glassco, Patrick Lane, Robert Hawkes, Silver Donald Cameron, Fred Cogswell, George Bowering and Seymour Mayne.

The final issue of Intercourse (No. 14) was guest-edited by Louis Cormier, and was heavily Buddhist-oriented.

References

 J. R. (Tim) Struthers, ed. The Montreal Story Tellers. Montreal: Véhicule Press, 1985. 191.
 Raymond Fraser. When The Earth Was Flat. Windsor: Black Moss Press, 2007. 162

1966 establishments in Canada
1971 disestablishments in Canada
Defunct literary magazines published in Canada
English-language magazines
Magazines established in 1966
Magazines disestablished in 1971
Poetry magazines published in Canada
Magazines published in Montreal